I Have to Feed Larry's Hawk is the seventh studio album by American singer-songwriter Tim Presley, working under the name Tim Presley's White Fence. It was released on January 25, 2019 through Drag City Records.

Track listing

References

2019 albums
Drag City (record label) albums
Tim Presley albums